Jeffrey Lee (born 3 October 1945) is a former professional football defender who played for Halifax Town and Peterborough United in the Football League.

Playing career
Lee started his career with Huddersfield Town as an amateur and then moved to Halifax Town in 1964/65. He then moved to Peterborough in 1973/74.

In 1979, whilst a Kettering Town player, he was selected in the initial 27-man squad for the England non-league international side by manager Howard Wilkinson. This was the first ever squad called for this newly formed team.

References

External links
1971 Halifax Town Squad Photo

1945 births
Living people
Association football defenders
English Football League players
English footballers
Footballers from Dewsbury
Halifax Town A.F.C. players
Huddersfield Town A.F.C. non-playing staff
Peterborough United F.C. players
Rochdale A.F.C. non-playing staff